Anokhin is a common Russian surname. Notable people having this surname include:

Andrey Victorovitch Anokhin (1867–1931) Russian ethnographer, musical scientist and composer
Maksim Olegovich Anokhin (Limewax; born 1988), Ukrainian musician
Nikolay Yuryevich Anokhin (born 1966), Russian artist
Pyotr Kuzmich Anokhin (1898–1974), Russian biologist and physiologist
Sergei Anokhin (disambiguation)
Sergei Nikolayevich Anokhin (born 1981), Russian football player
Sergei Nikolaevich Anokhin (1910–1986), Russian test pilot
Vasily Anokhin (born 1983), Russian politician